Beena Chaudhary is a Pakistani actress. She is known for her roles in dramas Romeo Weds Heer, Ishq Zahe Naseeb, Suno Chanda 2, Ghisi Piti Mohabbat and Kahin Deep Jaley.

Early life
Beena was born in 1968 on March 6 in Lahore, Pakistan. She completed her studies from University of Lahore.

Career
Beena made her debut as an actress on PTV in 2000. She was noted for her roles in dramas Aik Thi Rania, Tohmat, Tishnagi Dil Ki and Gumrah. She also appeared in dramas Mohabbat Tumse Nafrat Hai, Haya Ke Daaman Main, Dekho Chaand Aaya, Sammi and Tum Kon Piya. Since then she appeared in dramas Kaise Huaye Benaam, Mil Ke Bhi Hum Na Mile, Dharkan, Nazo, Raaz-e-Ulfat, Rasam and Khoob Seerat.

Personal life
Beena is married to Mohammad Zahid Sohail and has two children a son named Hannan Sohail and actress Hareem Sohail.

Filmography

Television

Telefilm

Film

References

External links
 
 
 

1968 births
Living people
Pakistani television actresses
21st-century Pakistani actresses
Pakistani film actresses